The Manus Plate is a 100-km microplate located northeast of New Guinea. The Manus Plate was formed in between the North Bismark Plate and the South Bismark Plate. The Manus Plate currently rotates counter-clockwise in the Melanesia area.

Formation 
The Manus Plate formed during the Brunhes-Matuyama reversal, making its maximum age approximately 781,000 years old. The Manus Plate formed in-between and on top of the transform boundaries that were separating the North and South Bismark plates. The plate was formed of young mid-ocean ridge basalt, along with pieces of older oceanic floor that had broken off of the South Bismarck plate.

Boundaries and Movement 
The north and northeast boundaries of the Manus Plate, with the North Bismark and Pacific plates are both convergent boundaries. The plates southeast borders of the South Bismark plate is a divergent boundary. The southwest boundary bordering the South Bismark plate is a transform boundary. The Manus plate currently has a rate of rotation of 51°/ Ma at the spot, -3.04°N, 150.46°E, in the counter-clockwise direction, due to the plates left lateral motion. This is likely the fastest plate rotation, on Earth at this time.

References

Tectonic plates
Geology of the Pacific Ocean